Chaudhry Muhammad Sarwar Khan (1919–2003); was the longest serving Parliamentarian in the history of Pakistan. He served in Provincial Assembly of the Punjab and National Assembly of Pakistan from 1951 to 1999 and was the longest serving member. The first direct elections held in Pakistan after independence were for the Provincial Assembly of the Punjab  between 10–20 March 1951.  He was elected as a Member of Legislative Assembly in 1951. He was again elected in the 1962 and 1964 Provincial Assembly elections in Pakistan.

Family background

Ch. Muhammad Sarwar Khan was born in a well known Sulehria Rajput family, who have Dogra Rajput ancestry in Rupochak, District Narowal cum Sialkot. He was a respected politician from Rupochak, Narowal. His father Khan Bahadur Qasim and uncle Kazim Khan both served in the British Indian army. Khan Bahadur Qasim won the 1937 election from the state of Kashmir and Jammu and his younger brother Kazim khan held a top bureaucratic post in British Raj after retirement. Ch.Muhammad Sarwar Khan's grandfather Hashim Khan also served in the British Indian Army during World War I in "58th Vaughan's Rifles (Frontier Force)" regiment and was awarded the Highest "Medal of Gallantry" during his service with Lord Kitchener in the Third Anglo-Afghan War. Hashim khan's father Sazawar Khan died fighting against the British during 1857 Indian Mutiny, his grandfather Abdul Nabi Khan was a Nawab in the Mughal court (No Hazari) and was under an obligation to provide 9000 troops to the Mughal Empire.

Ch. Muhammad Sarwar Khan has two sons, Barrister Mansoor Sarwar Khan and Tahir Sarwar.

Political career

Early politics 
Khan's younger brother Ch. Ghulam Ahmed Khan was a seasoned right-wing politician of Pakistan Muslim League. He was elected Member Provincial Assembly of Punjab (MPA) for five consecutive terms dating 1985 to 1999...

Ch. Muhammad Sarwar's son Barrister Mansoor Sarwar Khan is the first elected President of Central Punjab and Member Core-Committee and National Council Pakistan of Pakistan Tehreek-e-Insaf, Central Punjab is composed of Lahore and Gujranwala divisions having ten districts altogether.

Later politics and office 
He was elected as Member of the National Assembly of Pakistan in 1985, 1988, 1990, 1993 and 1997 General Elections. Despite being a stalwart of Pakistan Muslim League, Mr Sarwar accompanied Prime Minister Zulfikar Ali Bhutto for Simla Agreement in India in 1972 to ease the tensions between the two countries following the Indo-Pak war of 1971. On 24 December 1981, a Federal Council (Majlis-e-Shoora) was constituted by then President General Muhammad Zia-ul-Haq, Its members were nominated by the President. Khan served in the Federal Council from 1982–1984. In 1997, he was appointed as chairman Parliamentary Special Committee on Kashmir by then Prime Minister of Pakistan Muhammad Nawaz Sharif. He led Kashmir Committee composed of 26 MNA's from May 1997 to October 1999.

Following the landslide victory of Pakistan Muslim League (PML-N) in the 1997 parliamentary elections, Khan was nominated as the presidential candidate by the party but ultimately Nawaz Sharif appointed Rafique Tarar as the president of Pakistan.

After the 1999 coup d'état staged by General Pervez Musharraf, Prime Minister Nawaz Sharif was exiled to Saudi Arabia. Following the exile, Khan was nominated as the party president, however due to old age and deteriorating health he refused the party presidency and it was passed on to Makhdoom Javed Hashmi. Khan was referred as "Baba-e-Muslim League" by Nawaz Sharif due to his lifelong services in politics of Pakistan.

Role in Kargill War 
During Kargil War, as the Chairman of National Assembly Kashmir Committee, Khan addressed the United Nations Commission on Human Rights (UNCHR) in Geneva and asked the world powers to give Kashmiris the right of self-determination according to UN resolutions.

Death 
He died in 2003, at the age of 83 years in Sialkot District, Pakistan.

References 

Pakistan Tehreek-e-Insaf politicians
Narowal District
2003 deaths
1919 births